The Ambassador Extraordinary and Plenipotentiary of the Russian Federation to the Republic of Peru is the official representative of the President and the Government of the Russian Federation to the President and the Government of Peru.

The ambassador and his staff work at large in the Embassy of Russia in Lima.

History of diplomatic relations

Diplomatic relations between Peru and Russia date back to the 19th century. Emperor Alexander II sent a letter, dated 29 October 1862, to Miguel de San Román, president of Peru, congratulating him on his election and expressing his desire to maintain friendly relations between the Russian Empire and Peru.  The two countries signed their first official document, a Trade and Navigation Agreement in 1874, and by 1909 Peru had six consular missions in the Russian Empire: in Saint Petersburg, Moscow, Riga, Warsaw, Odessa and Kherson. 

Relations at the embassy level between the Soviet Union and Peru were established on 1 February 1969. Relations were strengthened after the 1970 Ancash earthquake, with the Soviet Union sending helicopters and medical aid. During the internal conflict in Peru, the embassy was targeted by terror group Shining Path, being bombed on at least one occasion. With the dissolution of the Soviet Union in 1991, Peru recognised the Russian Federation as its successor state on 26 December 1991.

List of representatives (1969 – present)

Representatives of the Soviet Union to Peru (1969 – 1991)

Representatives of the Russian Federation to Peru (1991 – present)

See also
List of ambassadors of Peru to Russia

References

 
Peru
Russia